Dayle Shackel (born 29 January 1970) is a New Zealand former cricketer. He played one List A match for Otago in 1993/94. Shackel later became the physiotherapist for the New Zealand cricket team, a role he kept until 2011, when he became the team's injury management and physiotherapy co-ordinator. In May 2002, Shackel was on tour in Pakistan with the New Zealand cricket team when he was caught up in a bomb blast. Since 2020, Shackel has worked at the medical manager for New Zealand Cricket.

See also
 List of Otago representative cricketers

References

External links
 

1970 births
Living people
New Zealand cricketers
Otago cricketers
Cricketers from Christchurch